Julián Bourges (died 1976) was an Argentine film actor. He starred in some 25 films between 1944 and 1975.

Biondo made his debut in 1944 in the film Importancia de ser ladrón and in 1956 La Dama del millón and in 1960 appeared in the Antonio Cunill Jr. film Los Acusados.

His last film was Carmiña: Su historia de amor  in 1975.

Selected filmography
 Cristina (1946)
 My Poor Beloved Mother (1948)
My Divine Poverty (1951) 
 The Beautiful Brummel (1951)
 The Candidate (1959)

References

External links
 

Year of birth missing
1976 deaths
Argentine male film actors
Male actors from Buenos Aires
20th-century Argentine male actors